Sulfapyridine (INN; also known as sulphapyridine) is a sulfanilamide antibacterial medication. At one time, it was commonly referred to as M&B 693.  Sulfapyridine is no longer prescribed for treatment of infections in humans.  However, it may be used to treat linear IgA disease and has use in veterinary medicine. It is a good antibacterial drug, but its water solubility is very pH dependent.  Thus there is a risk of crystallization within the bladder or urethra, which could lead to pain or blockage. As with other sulfonamides, there is a significant risk of agranulocytosis, and this, rather than the development of resistance by bacteria, is the main reason for its decline in use.

History

M&B 693 was one of the first generation of sulfonamide antibiotics. It was discovered by Lionel Whitby at the British firm May & Baker Ltd and logged in their Test Book on 2 November, 1937 under Code No M&B 693. 

During the aftermath to the disastrous convoy SC7, in October 1940, Surgeon-Lieutenant John Robertson, RN, of HMS Leith, saved the life of Commodore Lachlan MacKinnon, from the torpedoed Assyrian, who had developed pneumonia, by giving him M&B 693, despite Robertson never having used it before and not knowing the required dosage.

M&B 693 was successfully used to treat Winston Churchill's bacterial pneumonia. In a subsequent wartime radio broadcast on December 29, 1943, he said: "This admirable M&B, from which I did not suffer any inconvenience, was used at the earliest moment; and after a week's fever, the intruders were repulsed." This quote is attributed to Churchill's time in Tunis while visiting General Eisenhower's headquarters in December 1943. It was widely reported in the press the following day ['Mr Churchill's own bulletin', Yorkshire Post; 'Premier off to convalesce', East Anglian Times; 'Premier goes to convalescence - Destination unknown', Newcastle Journal].
The same source records that in 1944 M&B 693 also saved Nero, the Royal Circus lion, from pneumonia. [Glasgow Evening News January 1944.] It could either be taken in tablet form or the powder could be placed in wounds. It was used so widely during the Second World War that May & Baker had difficulty keeping up with demand. It was later largely superseded by penicillin and other sulfonamides.

Related medications
The drug sulfasalazine is structurally one molecule of mesalamine linked to one molecule of sulfapyridine with an azo chemical linker.

References

Sulfonamide antibiotics
2-Pyridyl compounds
Abandoned drugs